The Regina Medal is a literary award conferred annually by the Catholic Library Association.  It recognizes one living person for "continued, distinguished contribution to children's literature without regard to the nature of the contribution" and several recipients have been neither writers nor illustrators of children's books. It was inaugurated in 1959 and it is administered by Children's Library Services Section.

On the sixtieth anniversary of the Regina Medal its history was explored, and its recognition of literary careers that have spanned many generations and the aggregate impact their work has made on education, literacy, art, and librarianship for children was characterized as "immeasurable."

Regina Medal winners

1959 Eleanor Farjeon
1960 Anne Carroll Moore
1961 Padraic Colum
1962 Frederic G. Melcher
1963 Ann Nolan Clark
1964 May Hill Arbuthnot
1965 Ruth Sawyer
1966 Leo Politi
1967 Bertha Mahony Miller
1968 Marguerite de Angeli
1969 Lois Lenski
1970 Ingri and Edgar Parin d'Aulaire
1971 Tasha Tudor
1972 Meindert DeJong
1973 Frances Clarke Sayers
1974 Robert McCloskey
1975 May McNeer and Lynd Ward
1976 Virginia Haviland
1977 Marcia Brown
1978 Scott O'Dell
1979 Morton Schindel
1980 Beverly Cleary
1981 Augusta Baker
1982 Theodor Seuss Geisel
1983 Tomie dePaola
1984 Madeleine L'Engle
1985 Jean Fritz
1986 Lloyd Alexander
1987 Betsy Byars
1988 Katherine Paterson
1989 Steven Kellogg
1990 Virginia Hamilton
1991 Leonard Everett Fisher
1992 Jane Yolen
1993 Chris Van Allsburg
1994 Lois Lowry
1995 Gary Paulsen
1996 Russell Freedman
1997 Eve Bunting
1998 Patricia McKissack and Frederick McKissack
1999 Eric Carle
2000 Milton Meltzer
2001 E. L. Konigsburg
2002 Charlotte Zolotow
2003 Jean Craighead George
2004 Susan Hirschman
2005 Jerry Pinkney 
2006 Paul Goble
2007 Margaret K. McElderry
2008 Vera B. Williams
 2009 Lois Ehlert
 2010 Gail Gibbons
 2011 Ashley Bryan
 2012 Patricia Polacco
 2013 Kevin Henkes
 2014 Patricia Reilly Giff
 2015 Judy Blume
 2016 Lee Bennett Hopkins
 2017 David A. Adler
 2018 Andrea Davis Pinkney and Brian Pinkney
 2019 Kate DiCamillo
 2020 Christopher Paul Curtis
 2021 Jan Brett
 2022 Sophie de Mullenheim

References

American children's literary awards
Awards established in 1959